Chasing Yesterday may refer to:

 Chasing Yesterday (album), a 2015 album by Noel Gallagher's High Flying Birds
 Chasing Yesterday Tour, a tour by Noel Gallagher's High Flying Birds
 Chasing Yesterday (books), a series of books by Robin Wasserman
 Chasing Yesterday (film), a 1935 historical drama film directed by George Nicholls Jr.